Carbonaro may refer to:

Singular form of Carbonari
Michael Carbonaro, American actor and magician
The Carbonaro Effect, a hidden-camera TV series hosted by Michael Carbonaro
John Carbonaro, owner of JC Comics
Martino Carbonaro, an 1801 Italian opera
Arturo Carbonaro (born 1986), Italian footballer
Paolo Carbonaro (born 1989), Italian footballer

See also
Carbonara